Gbagyi or Gbari (plural - Agbagyi/Agbari) is the name and the language of Gbagyi/Gbari ethnic group who are predominantly found in Central Nigeria, with a population of about 1 million people. Members of the ethnic group speak two dialects. While speakers of the dialects were loosely called Gwari by both the Hausa Fulani and Europeans during pre-colonial Nigeria they prefer to be known as Gbagyi/Gbari. They live in the Niger, the Federal Capital Territory - Abuja, and Kaduna State. They are also found in Nasarawa central Nigeria Area. Gbagyi/Gbari is one of the most populated ethnic and indigenous group in the middle belt and Federal Capital Territory of Nigeria and their major occupation is farming. Pottery is also an occupation practiced by the women.

History

Social-political structure
Historically, the Gbagyi/Gbari practice a patrilineal kinship system. The lowest tier of authority is found in the extended family compound led by the oldest male. The compound consist of small huts and rectangular buildings. The Esu/Osu (king) is the highest tier of authority in a Gbagyi/Gbari settlement and he is assisted by a group of elders. e Gbagyi/Gbari people are predominantly farmers but they are also hunters whilst some are involved in making traditional arts and craft products such as pottery and woodwork like mortar and pestle. The Gbagyi/Gbari are proficient with mixing clay to produce decorative household products such as pots. They are also known to be very good farmers, as they use local farm instruments like hoes and cutlasses to farm yams, maize, millet and groundnuts.

Settlement
The Gbagyi people are found in various locations in Middle Belt (Central) Nigeria. They inhabit the western parts of Abuja, southern Niger State, Chikun Local Government Area with its headquarters at Kujama in Kaduna state and Nassarawa states. Significant Gbagyi towns include Minna, Karu, Kuta, Kwakuti, Kwali, Gawu, (Gusolo) Gussoro, (Gbada) Gwada, Guni, Fuka, Galkogo, Maikunle, Manta, Wushapa (Ushafa), Bisi, Bwaya (Bwari), Suleja, Shiroro (Shilolo), Beji, Diko, Alawa, Erena, Paiko/ paigo lanbata, zugba and farin doki are some theories that posits a reason for the scattered settlements and migration of the Gbagyi people. Some historians believe the Gbagyi were displaced from their original settlements during the Fulani Jihad, while some local historians link migration with the need for farmland by the Gbagyi. Chigudu, pp. 1–2

Gbagyi settlements can be both large and small. In locations where farming is the dominant occupation, the settlements tend to be small so that enough land is available for farming.

Displacement from lands in Abuja
The Gbagyi were the largest among the ethnic groups that inhabited the land proposed for development when Abuja was chosen as Nigeria's new federal capital. The result of the dislocation was the removal of people from their ancestral homes, from spiritual symbols such as Zuma Rock, seeing their ancestral land be referred to as no-man's land and issues about adjusting to the new environment given by the government. However, many displaced families were given housing, but some lived in transit and settlements camps for a long while.

Culture

The Gbagyi people are known to be peace-loving, transparent and accommodating people.  Northerners are fond of saying in Hausa language muyi shi Gwari Gwari, "let’s do it like the Gbagyi" or "in the Gbagyi way". According to Tanko Chigudu, the Gbagyi people have emerged as a unique breed among Nigerians: their culture shows how much they have come to terms with the universe. Daily they aspire to give life a meaning no matter the situation in which they find themselves.

Language

The Gbagyi language is part of the Kwa sub-division of the Niger-Congo language family, however, some researchers such as Kay Williamson put the language in the Benue-Congo family. The people speak two dialects that are sometimes called Gbari (Gwari yamma) and Gbagyi dialects.

Religion
The Gbagyi people are adherents of Islam, Christianity and their own traditional religion. In their traditional religion, some Gbagyi believe in a God called Shekwoi (one who was there before their ancestors) but they also devote themselves to appeasing deities of the god such as Maigiro. Many Agbagyi believe in reincarnation.

Islam became more prominent among the people after the Fulani jihad while Christianity was introduced to the people by the Sudan Interior Mission (which also came to be known locally as Evangelical Church of West Africa) and the Baptist Missionaries from the western part of Nigeria.

List of notable Gbagyi people 

 Bez, musician
 Ibrahim Babangida, former president of Nigeria
 Ladi Kwali, potter
 Abdulsalami Abubakar, former military leader of Nigeria

References

Sources

Ethnic groups in Nigeria